Surkovo is a rural locality (a selo) in Shebekinsky District, Belgorod Oblast, Russia. The population was 727 as of 2010. There are 4 streets.

Geography 
Surkovo is located 33 km northeast of Shebekino (the district's administrative centre) by road. Pervoye Tseplyayevo is the nearest rural locality.

References 

Rural localities in Shebekinsky District